Liobole is a lower Carboniferous proetid trilobite.

Etymology 

Liobole was described from material found in the Moravian Karst. The species shown is from the lower carboniferous of SW England.

Distribution 
Liobole is found in the European Culm facies and has been collected from the lower Carboniferous across Europe for example from (Visian) deposits of SW England and (Tournaisian) of Poland and as far east as China.

Taxonomy 
Identified as proetid trilobite from the lower Visean Brezina formation by Chlupáč 1966.

References

External links 
 Early Visean trilobites
 Atheloptic Visean Trilobite association

Carboniferous animals
Proetidae
Proetida genera